The island swiftlet, also known as the Caroline swiftlet, Micronesian swiftlet, or Caroline Islands swiftlet, (Aerodramus inquietus) is a species of swift in the family Apodidae. Some taxonomists consider it to be a subspecies of the uniform swiftlet. It is endemic to the Caroline Islands, and its natural habitat is subtropical or tropical moist lowland forests.

References

External links 
 Caroline swiftlet Aerodramus inquietus (BirdLife International)
 Caroline swiftlet Aerodramus inquietus (IUCN Red List of Threatened Species)
 Chim Yến đảo . Chim Yến Việt Nam

island swiftlet
Fauna of the Caroline Islands
Birds of Micronesia
island swiftlet
island swiftlet